Brannan Island is a small island in the Sacramento–San Joaquin River Delta. It is part of Sacramento County, California, and is managed by Reclamation District 2067. A "Brannan Island", with the same location but a slightly different shape, is labeled on an 1850 survey map of the San Francisco Bay area made by Cadwalader Ringgold as well as an 1854 map of the area by Henry Lange.

References

Islands of Sacramento County, California
Islands of the Sacramento–San Joaquin River Delta
Islands of Northern California